Zambak magazine was an ethnic Bosniak political magazine published in Chicago between the years 1994 and 2008. It was founded during the war in Bosnia and Herzegovina as large groups of Bosnian refugees settled in the United States. Zambak started as a newsletter published by the Information Center of Bosnia Herzegovina in Chicago, and one year later it became an independent magazine publishing monthly issues until 2008.

History
Zambak reported on political, economic, and cultural developments globally, in Bosnia and Herzegovina, as well as on the activities of the local Bosnian community in Chicago. The magazine's mission was to inform and support the process of integration of the thousands of newly arrived emigres from the conflict-ridden Balkan region. It promoted strong links between local small-businesses and the community. Zambak was committed to upholding and promoting the belief of a united and multi-ethnic Bosnia and Herzegovina by fostering a platform for diverse political exchanges.

Zambak'''s director and owner was Ismet Berbić. Its editors, over the years, include: Bakir Viteškić, Mensur Seferović, Esad Boškailo, Amir Berberkić, and Mugdim Karabeg. Regular contributors from Bosnia and Herzegovina were notable writers and journalists such as Mile Stojić and Gojko Berić, amongst others.Zambak was recognized for its particular attention to arts and culture and design and illustrations. The magazine's use of provocative, satirical and politically engaged covers  reflected the pertinent themes of each issue. Zambak was art-directed by brothers Amir Berbić (1998–2004) and Isak Berbić (2004–2008).Zambak was distributed free of charge, which was made possible by the financial support of local businesses. In 2008, after 105 published issues, Zambak ceased publication amidst difficult financial circumstances.

Throughout its history, Zambak's contributors published stories on politics, war, immigrant life in the US, culture, arts, and education.

Name
The name Zambak (Lily'') is in reference to the fleur-de-lis symbol, lilium bosniacum, on the Bosnian medieval coat of arms which was revitalized in the early 1990s Bosnian independence movements.

References

General references
Zambak magazine, issues 1–105, 1994–2008.
Crna Duša by Ahmet M. Rahmanović published by Zambak, 1998
Chicago Public Library: http://www.chipublib.org/search/details/cn/1588889
Bosnian American Library of Chicago: http://www.bosnianlibrarychicago.com/index.html

1994 establishments in Illinois
2008 disestablishments in Illinois
Bosnian-American culture in Illinois
Defunct political magazines published in the United States
Free magazines
Magazines established in 1994
Magazines disestablished in 2008
Magazines published in Chicago
Monthly magazines published in the United States
Newsletters